Hieracium coniops is a species of flowering plant belonging to the family Asteraceae.

Its native range is Northern and Northeastern Europe.

References

coniops